Town is Dead is a 2016 play by Phillip McMahon and Raymond Scannell.

The play portrays a working-class woman in her late 60s living in Dublin and forced to move. This pulls her back into her memories of a life of enduring deprivation, violence, addiction and tragedy. Her grim life story is expounded through dialogue, song, movement and music.

References

External links

2016 plays